Vanhala is a Finnish surname.

Geographical distribution
As of 2014, 85.8% of all known bearers of the surname Vanhala were residents of Finland.

In Finland, the frequency of the surname was higher than national average in the following regions:
 1. Kymenlaakso (1:395)
 2. Päijänne Tavastia (1:1,893)
 3. North Ostrobothnia (1:1,898)
 4. Central Ostrobothnia (1:2,090)
 5. Lapland (1:2,374)
 6. Central Finland (1:3,009)
 7. Tavastia Proper (1:3,095)

People
Jari Vanhala (born 1965), Finnish footballer
Keijo Vanhala (1940–2003), Finnish modern pentathlete

References

Finnish-language surnames